Ray-Ban Stories are smartglasses created as a collaboration between Meta Platforms and EssilorLuxottica. The product includes two cameras, open-ear speakers, a microphone, and touchpad, all built into the frame. The glasses, announced in August 2020 and released on September 9, 2021, had a controversial reception stemming from mistrust over Facebook’s privacy scandals. The small size of the recording indicator light has also led to controversy post-release. Ray-Ban Stories are the latest in a line of smartglasses released by major companies including Snap Inc and Google and are designed as one component of Facebook’s plans for a metaverse. Unlike smart glasses previously created by other companies, the Ray-Ban Stories do not include any HUD or AR head-mounted display.

Partnership and release 

The partnership between EssilorLuxottica, Ray-Ban's parent company, and Facebook to create the first generation of Ray-Ban Stories was publicly announced on September 20, 2020 by CEO Mark Zuckerberg during the seventh annual Facebook Connect conference. During the keynote video, Zuckerberg described several new Facebook innovations, such as the Oculus Quest 2, a new augmented reality division called Project Aria, and the Ray-Ban Stories themselves.

In the following year after its initial announcement, Zuckerberg and Facebook Chief Technology Officer Andrew Bosworth would hint at a 2021 release date through FPV (first person view) video clips appearing to be taken using a Ray-Ban Stories prototype.

On September 9th, 2021, Facebook launched Ray-Ban Stories, which were touted as the company’s first product related to its plans for a metaverse.

Development 

According to Facebook, the Luxottica team re-engineered the components of the glasses to fit technology such as: a set of micro-speakers, a three-microphone audio array, an optimized Snapdragon® processor, a capacitive touchpad, and a battery. As the glasses are very small, their size caused the engineers to miniaturize each component.

Facebook also states that their engineers used a bass-reflex system in developing the microphones to improve audio quality. For the camera system, an extensive image processing pipeline was utilized to produce high quality video.

To find a viable charging solution, Facebook said they explored multiple solutions and created 20 engineering validation tests to ensure the charging worked.

To address privacy concerns of users and those around them, engineers said they created a hardware power switch and a hardwired LED light to indicate when the camera is recording.

Components and features

Hardware 

Ray-Ban Stories glasses come in three designs; Round, Wayfarer, and Meteor. Each of these designs come in up to six colors with polarized, transitioning, blue-light filtering, and single or progressive prescription lenses. The glasses also come with two cameras- one for pictures and one video- and connect to the phone with Bluetooth. Photos and videos are automatically stored on the users Facebook account, so an account is necessary for these glasses. The temples of the frames contain speakers and microphones which are used for Facebook Assistant voice control. On the top of the right temple there is a touchpad for touch control to either take a 30 second video by tapping once or take a photo by holding down on the touchpad. Every pair comes with a charging case and USB-C charging cable, which can fully charge the glasses in just over an hour with three hours of battery life. The cameras, microphones, speakers, and touchpad are all connected to a Qualcomm Snapdragon® processor. There is also a corresponding Facebook view app.

Compatibility 
Stories are compatible with IOS and Android. They currently work with IOS 13 and Android 8.1 and later and do not have backwards compatibility. They support Bluetooth 5.0. The Ray-Ban Stories connect to Wi-Fi 802.11ac.

Facebook view app 
To view, manage, and edit content captured on Ray-Ban Stories, Facebook released the Facebook View mobile app on August 23, 2021 in both the Apple App Store and Google Play Store. When using the app, users are prompted to log in with their Facebook account before pairing their Ray-Ban Stories to get access to sharing and management features. Current features on the app include importing, editing, and formatting photos and videos shot on Ray-Ban Stories for sharing on Facebook affiliated products such as Instagram, Messenger, WhatsApp, and other social media sites. The app also shows the Stories’ battery percentage.

Specifications 

 Dual 5MP cameras (One photo, one video)
 Photo captures 2592x1944px
 Video captures 1184 x 1184 at 30fps
 2 Micro Speakers
 3 Microphone array
 Touch Controls
 Facebook claims there is memory for more than 500 photos and 30 videos, but there is no solid number available currently
 Qualcomm Snapdragon processor

Privacy concerns 
Commentators have raised concerns about the potential invasion of privacy. Without prior knowledge of the product, the glasses could be confused for a regular pair of Ray-Ban sunglasses by individuals in close proximity to the user. Another feature that poses a potential privacy concern has to do with the device’s listening capabilities. Individuals have voiced concerns about the ability of our smart devices to record and listen to us, with or without our permission. However, Facebook alleges that the glasses are only able to listen to the user after hearing the “Hey, Facebook” wake phrase, which in turn will alert the glasses to one of three commands, take a photo, record a video, or stop recording. Additionally, in light of the recent privacy and security breaches happening at Facebook, there has been a growing number of concerns over how data is stored and retrieved from different devices. Facebook, in response to this concern, stated that they will not be able to access the content captured via Ray-Ban Stories without authorization from the user. In contrast to this, the Facebook View app says that the user's voice commands could be sent to Facebook unless the user explicitly opts out. According to the company, this data would be used to "personalize" the user's experience. The company also shared that it has a team dedicated to encrypting photos and data in order to prevent cyber hacking.

The concern that has generated the most vocal response- including concerns from Facebook’s lead privacy regulator in Europe, the Irish Data Protection Committee (DPC), centers on the effectiveness of the glasses at alerting other individuals when they are being photographed or recorded. Facebook claims that the LED light feature in the upper right hand corner of the glasses is able to notify individuals that the person wearing the glasses is recording a video or capturing a photo from up to 25 feet away. However, the article issued by Facebook does not mention anything about the implications if a user were to cover the LED light. Nonetheless, the article released by the company does mention some suggested good practices for safety and being a good community member, including: respecting people’s preferences, explaining how the LED light works, not capturing images while operating a vehicle, and powering off the glasses in private spaces.

Competition 
Facebook introduced Ray-Ban Stories in a competitive market filled with products from other technology giants. In 2013, Google released Google Glass which was the first product in this space created by the big tech firms. In 2016, Snap, Inc. launched the first generation Spectacles which were glasses that had a camera that syncs photos and videos to users' phones. Snap followed up with a second version in 2018, and a third version in 2019. There are also rumors that Apple and Microsoft are developing their own augmented reality or tech-assisted glasses.

See also 

 Smartglasses
 Google Glass - Smartglasses developed by Google
 Spectacles (product) - AR smart glasses by Snapchat
 EyeTap – eye-mounted camera and head-up display (HUD)
 Golden-i – head-mounted computer
 Microsoft HoloLens – Windows 10 based AR unit, with high-definition 3D optical head-mounted display and spatial sound
 Looxcie – ear-mounted streaming video camera
 Oculus Rift – wide field of view virtual reality (VR) goggles with low latency head tracking
 Pristine – enterprise video collaboration and support software
 SixthSense – wearable AR device
 Virtual retinal display – display technology that projects images directly onto the retina
 Vuzix – augmented reality smart glasses
 Privacy Concerns
 Criticism of Facebook
 Privacy concerns with Facebook
 Facebook–Cambridge Analytica data scandal
 Metaverse

External links 

 Discover Ray-Ban Stories
 Ray-Ban Stories - official site

References 

Facebook software
Wearable devices